Cladonia caespiticia is a widespread and common species of fruticose, cup lichen in the family Cladoniaceae. It was originally named Baeomyces caespiticius by German mycologist Christiaan Hendrik Persoon in 1794. Heinrich Gustav Flörke transferred it to the genus Cladonia in 1827. In North America, it is commonly known as the stubby-stalked Cladonia.

See also
List of Cladonia species

References

caespiticia
Lichen species
Lichens described in 1794
Lichens of Asia
Lichens of Central America
Lichens of Europe
Lichens of North America
Lichens of South America
Lichens of Oceania
Taxa named by Christiaan Hendrik Persoon